"One Love" is a song recorded by the Sweden based musician and producer Dr Alban. It was the second single from his second studio album, One Love (1992). Alban co-wrote it with Denniz PoP, who also produced it. Released in August 1992, the song was a hit in many European countries. It made it to the top-10 in Austria, Belgium, Finland, Germany, Ireland (number three) and Norway; however, the song was not as successful as "It's My Life", the previous single. On the Eurochart Hot 100, "One Love" peaked at number 23. Outside Europe, it was successful in Israel, reaching number five.

Critical reception
Larry Flick from Billboard described the song as "a clever, harmonious call for unity over a string-laden ragga/swing groove that demands urban radio play and a sleaze-speed club remix." Pan-European magazine Music & Media wrote, "Another hit out of the doctor's private practice is on its way. The "Africana" version will make alternative programmers blush admitting that a popular artist can be innovating as well, but not for Dutch alternative public outlet, VPRO's DJ Lux Janssen. "I play the song, although it might not be 'comme it faut' in our [left of center] surroundings. For me, however, Dr. Alban has the right amount of slickness."

Track listings
 7" single
 "One Love" (radio version) — 4:12
 "Reggae Gone Ragga" (album version) — 4:01

 CD single
 "One Love" (radio version) — 4:12
 "Reggae Gone Ragga" (album version) — 4:01

 CD maxi
 "One Love" (radio version) — 4:12
 "One Love" (extended version) — 6:03
 "One Love" (dragon fly version) — 5:17
 "One Love" (africana version) — 4:55

Charts

Weekly charts

Year-end charts

References

1992 singles
1992 songs
Dr. Alban songs
Electro songs
Songs written by Denniz Pop
Songs written by Dr. Alban
Song recordings produced by Denniz Pop
English-language Swedish songs